Dinavartamani began in 1855 as bilingual in Tamil and Telugu with a separate edition of Telugu started in 1856. Dinavartamani was a weekly edited by Peter Percival and issued from Madras.  Its Telugu edition in 1856 had a circulation of 700 copies. The journal covered routine news, science, tales and a few essays on topics of general interest.

References

Telugu-language newspapers
Tamil-language newspapers published in India
1855 establishments in India
Newspapers established in 1855
Newspapers published in Chennai